Michele Morettini (born 25 December 1991) is an Italian cricketer. He was named in Italy's squad for the 2016 ICC World Cricket League Division Four tournament in Los Angeles, playing in two matches.

References

External links
 

1991 births
Living people
Italian cricketers
Place of birth missing (living people)